Brie Joy King (born January 24, 1998) is a Canadian volleyball player and musician. She is part of the Canadian women's national volleyball team. Professionally, she plays for Brazilian club Sesc-RJ/Flamengo.

Personal life

King is a Christian, and along with her husband Jeremy, built a church in Vancouver in 2020.

King is singer/songwriter. She released her first album entitled First Things First in 2021.

Career

College

King played collegiate volleyball at Trinity Western University in Langley, British Columbia.

Professional clubs

 Dresdner SC
 Athletes Unlimited (2021)
 Béziers Volley [fr] (2021–2022)
 Sesc-RJ/Flamengo (2022–)

Canadian national team

King joined the Canadian national team in 2019. She was named the "Best Setter" at the 2021 Pan-American Cup.

Awards and honors

International
 2021 Women's Pan-American Volleyball Cup – Best Setter

Discography

Albums

First Things First (2021)

References

Exteneral links
 
 

1998 births
Living people
Canadian women's volleyball players
Sportspeople from British Columbia
Setters (volleyball)
Expatriate volleyball players in the United States
Expatriate volleyball players in Germany
Expatriate volleyball players in France
Expatriate volleyball players in Brazil
Canadian women singers
Canadian guitarists
Canadian songwriters
21st-century Canadian women singers
Canadian Christians
Trinity Western University alumni
Canadian expatriate sportspeople in France
Canadian expatriate sportspeople in Germany
Canadian expatriate sportspeople in Brazil